Temple Beth Israel is a Conservative synagogue located on Temple Drive in Port Washington, New York. Founded in 1933, it is affiliated with the United Synagogue of Conservative Judaism, and is the oldest synagogue in Port Washington. The congregation initially met in a rented location at Shore Road and Main Street, and in 1938 purchased a building at 138 Bayview Avenue. Its current building was designed by Percival Goodman in 1960, and dedicated in 1962.

Robert E. Fine joined as rabbi in 2007. He was succeeded by Michael Mishkin in August 2009.

Notes

1933 establishments in New York (state)
1960 establishments in New York (state)
Conservative synagogues in New York (state)
Modernist architecture in New York (state)
Percival Goodman synagogues
Jewish organizations established in 1933
Synagogues completed in 1960
Synagogues in Nassau County, New York
Town of North Hempstead, New York